The province of Varese is a province in the region of Lombardy in northern Italy. Its capital is the city of Varese (population of 80,857 inhabitants), but its largest city is Busto Arsizio. The headquarters of the AgustaWestland, the company merged into Leonardo since 2016, the world's largest producer of helicopters, is based in Samarate, a comune of the province.

History
In Roman times, the fortified settlements of Castelseprio and the port of Angera were of high importance in the region. The House of Visconti conquered the region in the 13th century and completely destroyed Castelseprio. The House of Visconti used the land for agricultural purposes and as part of the territories of Milan. During this Visconti rule, Varese became prosperous due to high levels of trade in the region but remained small. Prior to his appointment as Duke, Francesco III d'Este, Duke of Modena lived in the region during the 18th century. While the unification of Italy was initiating, Italian general Giuseppe Garibaldi attempted to install anti-Austrians in Varese; in response to this, the Austrians attempted to invade in 1859, and a battle occurred in Varese, resulting in Garibaldi's victory. During the second half of the 19th century, the area saw considerable economic growth with the birth of numerous factories, especially in the paper, mechanical, and textile industries. Umberto Bossi was born in 1941 near Varese, who believed that the region of Lombardy should have a degree of independence; in 1986, he founded the Lombard League which became a component of the Lega Nord (North League).

Geography
The province of Varese is one of twelve provinces in the region of Lombardy in northern Italy. It is the most northwesterly province in the region and its northern border forms the international boundary with Switzerland. The Province of Verbano-Cusio-Ossola in the Piedmont region lies to the northwest and the Province of Novara, also in Piedmont, to the west. To the south lies the Metropolitan City of Milan, and to the east, the Province of Monza and Brianza, and the Province of Como. The provincial capital is the city of Varese, which is situated beside Lake Varese at the foot of Sacro Monte di Varese, part of the Campo dei Fiori di Varese mountain range; the city is also close to the Cinque Vette Park.

The agriculture of this sub-Alpine region is based on livestock farming and the economy mainly relies on the industrial sector, with many people commuting daily to Milan. Among the main companies headquartered in the province are Alenia Aermacchi (aeronautics), AgustaWestland (aeronautics), Bticino (metalworking), Cagiva (motorcycles), Birrificio Angelo Poretti (brewery), Ignis (home appliances), Vibram (footwear soles). In the past the province was famous for its textile industry, especially in the Olona Valley and the Busto Arsizio-Gallarate area, but this has gradually declined since the 1970s. Likewise, Varese was the birthplace of some of Italy's main aircraft manufacturers; in addition to the already-mentioned Aermacchi and AgustaWestland, Savoia Marchetti was also born here.

There are local cheeses made from goat's milk and local meat dishes, and there are freshwater fish caught in the many lakes. Other local products are a local variety of asparagus, chestnuts, berries and honey, and grapes grown locally are made into traditional red and white wines.

References

External links

 Official website 
 

 
Varese
Varese